Emergency brake can refer to:

Cars and motor vehicles
 Autonomous emergency braking (AEB) in a collision avoidance system, which engages the main braking system in automobiles when a computer detects an imminent collision
 Emergency brake assist (EBA or BA), which increases braking effectiveness when a human driver executes a panic stop
 Parking brake or hand brake in automobiles, which can also be used in case of failure of the main braking system

Planes
 Autobrake, a system for automating braking during takeoff and landing of airplanes

Trains
 Emergency brake (train), a term which can refer to a stronger-than-normal braking level, a separate backup braking system, or the lever used to engage the backup braking system
 Train protection system, which engages an emergency brake in dangerous situations